Tianshan Gate of the World Plots 27 and 28 is a mixed-use supertall skyscraper on-hold in Shijiazhuang, China by the Tianshan Gate of the World Block A, International Finance Center. Construction started in 2019 and will be completed in 2027.

See also
List of tallest buildings in China
List of tallest buildings in Shijiazhuang

References

Buildings and structures under construction in China
Skyscrapers in Hebei
Buildings and structures in Shijiazhuang